Quillen is a surname of Irish origin. It could refer to:

Daniel Quillen, a mathematician
Jimmy Quillen, a former member of the United States House of Representatives from Tennessee
East Tennessee State University James H. Quillen College of Medicine, named for Jimmy Quillen